Marjorie Noël (born Françoise Nivot; 25 December 1945 – 30 April 2000) was a French pop singer who had a brief career in the mid-1960s, and is best known for her participation on behalf of Monaco in the 1965 Eurovision Song Contest. 
 
Noël was born in Paris.  Her first recordings were released in 1964, and the following year she was invited to represent Monaco in the tenth Eurovision Song Contest, to take place in Naples, Italy on 20 March. The chosen song, "Va dire à l'amour" ("Go Tell Love"), a gentle strings-driven ballad, ended in ninth place of the 18 entries.  She would later take part in the 1965 La Rose d'Or festival in Antibes, and released in total seven EPs.

Noël retired from showbusiness in 1967 and spent the rest of her life in anonymity. She died of a cerebral hemorrhage, aged 54, in Cavaillon, Vaucluse, on 30 April 2000.

Discography 
 1964: "Tu vas partir"
 1964: "Si j'étais plus jolie qu'elle"
 1965: "Va dire à l'amour"
 1965: "Je te dis mon âge"
 1965: "Fais attention"
 1966: "Les portes-clefs"
 1967: "Au temps des princes charmants"

References

External links 
 Discography and cover art at encyclopédisque.fr

Eurovision Song Contest entrants for Monaco
Eurovision Song Contest entrants of 1965
Musicians from Paris
1945 births
2000 deaths
20th-century French women singers